Elena María Tejeiro is a Spanish film and television actress.

Filmography

References

Bibliography 
 Peter Cowie & Derek Elley. World Filmography: 1967. Fairleigh Dickinson University Press, 1977.

External links 
 

1939 births
Living people
Spanish film actresses
People from Murcia
Actors from the Region of Murcia